Pat O'Neal is a retired American football coach. He is known for coaching East Central University in Ada, Oklahoma from 1972 to 1989, where he won 96 games and retired as the program's all-time winningest coach. Prior to that, he played under coach Bud Wilkinson at the University of Oklahoma from 1951 to 1954.

Head coaching record

References

Year of birth missing (living people)
Living people
East Central Tigers football coaches
Oklahoma Sooners football players
People from Ada, Oklahoma